Andreas Pantziaras (born December 13, 1976) is a Cypriot football manager.

Personal
His father is Georgios Pantziaras.

References

1976 births
Living people
Cypriot football managers
Platanias F.C. managers
Apollon Pontou FC managers
Panserraikos F.C. managers
Doxa Drama F.C. managers
Makedonikos F.C. managers
Cypriot expatriate sportspeople in Greece
Expatriate football managers in Greece
Cypriot expatriate football managers